South Park Elementary School may refer to:

South Park Elementary School (Delta, British Columbia) in School District 37 Delta
South Park Elementary School (Victoria, British Columbia) in School District 61 Greater Victoria
 South Park Elementary, the fictional elementary school in the series South Park
 South Park Elementary School, a former school in the Shawnee Mission School District, Kansas